The Legend of Silk Boy is a 2010 Chinese animated film directed by David Liu and starring Jackie Chan.

Cast
 Jackie Chan as Xu Rongcun
 Ashleigh Ball as Silk Boy
 Garry Chalk as Grandfather
 Michael Donovan as Ginsing King
 Maryke Hendrikse as Tour Guide Tammy 
 Richard Ian Cox as Puffball
 Brian Drummond as Stinkhorn, Lucky 
 Anna Cummer as Anya

References

External links
 
 Official Website

2010 films
Chinese animated films
2010 animated films
2010s English-language films